Peter Richard Orszag (born December 16, 1968) is the CEO of Financial Advisory at Lazard.  Before June 2019, he was the firm's Head of North American M&A and Global Co-Head of Healthcare.

Orszag previously served as a Vice Chairman of Corporate and Investment Banking and Chairman of the Financial Strategy and Solutions Group at Citigroup. Before joining Citigroup, he was a Distinguished Visiting Fellow
at the Council on Foreign Relations and a contributing columnist for the New York Times op-ed page.  Prior to that, he was the 37th Director of the Office of Management and Budget (OMB) under President Barack Obama and had also served as the Director of the Congressional Budget Office (CBO).

Orszag is a member of the National Academy of Medicine of the National Academies of Sciences.  He serves on the Boards of Directors of the Peterson Institute for International Economics, the Mount Sinai Hospital, and New Visions for Public Schools in New York.

Early life
Orszag grew up in Lexington, Massachusetts, the son of Reba (née Karp) and Steven Orszag. His paternal great-grandparents were Jewish immigrants from Hungary who immigrated to New York City in 1903. His father, Steven Orszag, was a math professor at Yale University and his mother was the president and owner of a research and development company. His brother is Jonathan Orszag, the Senior Managing Director of Compass Lexecon, LLC.

After graduating from Phillips Exeter Academy with high honors (1987), Orszag earned an A.B. summa cum laude in economics from Princeton University in 1991 after completing an 80-page long senior thesis titled "Congressional Oversight of the Federal Reserve: Empirical and Theoretical Perspectives." He then received a M.Sc. (1992) and a Ph.D. (1997) in economics from the London School of Economics. His doctoral thesis was titled Dynamic analysis of regime shifts under uncertainty: Applications to hyperinflation and privatization. He was a Marshall Scholar 1991–1992, and is a member of Phi Beta Kappa.

Career
Orszag became a lecturer at the University of California, Berkeley, and taught macroeconomics in 1999 and 2000. As a senior fellow and Deputy Director of Economic Studies at the Brookings Institution, he co-founded and directed The Hamilton Project and (in conjunction with Georgetown University's Public Policy Institute) the Pew Charitable Trust's Retirement Security Project.

He served as Special Assistant to the President for Economic Policy (1997–1998), and as Senior Economist and Senior Adviser on the Council of Economic Advisers (1995–1996) during the Clinton administration. He also formed a consulting group called Sebago Associates, which merged into Competition Policy Associates and was bought by FTI Consulting Inc. for a reported $70 million.

After leaving the Obama administration, Orszag took a job with Citigroup. A 2011 article in New York Magazine suggested Citi's hiring of Orszag "signaled that Citi would be invested in the intellectual marketplace," and that "just about anyone will take the call of a former White House budget director." In May 2016, Orszag joined Lazard as managing director and vice chairman of investment banking.

He is also an invitee of the Bilderberg Group and attended the conferences in 2010, 2011 and 2012.

Congressional Budget Office
Orszag was director of the Congressional Budget Office from January 2007 to November 2008. During his tenure, he repeatedly drew attention to the role rising health care expenditures are likely to play in the government's long-term fiscal problems—and, by extension, the nation's long-term economic problems. "I have not viewed CBO's job as just to passively evaluate what Congress proposes, but rather to be an analytical resource. And part of that is to highlight things that are true and that people may not want to hear, including that we need to address health-care costs." During his time at the CBO, he added 20 full-time health analysts (bringing the total number to 50), thereby strengthening the CBO's analytical capabilities and preparing Congress for health-care reform.

He was widely praised for his time at CBO for preparing the agency for the debates to come.  When he stepped down, National Journal noted that "Orszag, who will turn 40 on Dec. 16, has been praised by lawmakers from both parties as an objective analyst with deep knowledge of the most pressing fiscal issues of the day, including health care policy, Social Security, pensions, and global climate change. He is the unusual economist who blends an understanding of politics, policy and communications in ways that wrap zesty quotes around complex ideas."

Office of Management and Budget
On November 25, 2008, President-elect Barack Obama announced that Orszag would be his nominee for director of the Office of Management and Budget, the arm of the White House responsible for crafting the federal budget and overseeing the effectiveness of federal programs.
Orszag, in a November 2009 speech in New York, said that deficits, which were expected to add $9 trillion to the existing national debt of $12 trillion over the next decade, are "serious and ultimately unsustainable." He said that deficit spending was necessary to help boost the economy when unemployment is hovering around 10 percent. But he said that red ink must be stopped as the economy recovers. During a recovery, private investment will again pick up and compete with the federal government for capital. In 2011, he was described by New York Magazine as a "deficit hawk and clashed with Larry Summers, who wasn’t as focused on the long-term debt crisis."

In July 2010 Orszag said that "The problem now is weak growth and high unemployment rather than outright economic collapse". Still, the deficit would be equivalent to 10 percent of the gross domestic product, the highest level since World War II. The Office of Management and Budget's mid-session review, forecast a smaller deficit and stronger economic growth than the administration's initial budget release. The deficit forecast in 2011 increased to $1.42 trillion, up from the $1.27 estimate in February. For 2012, the deficit estimate rose to $922 billion, up from $828 billion in the previous report. The annual budget shortfall would bottom out in 2017 at $721 billion, or 3.4 percent of GDP, and begin rising again in following years.

A review of Orszag's daily schedules shows his sustained focus on healthcare reform as soon as he joined Obama's Cabinet. The daily schedules for Orszag, who left his position as OMB director in July 2010, reveal that he and key White House aides regularly met to discuss healthcare starting in January 2009, within days of Obama entering office. Orszag also had meetings with insurance executives and health experts as the White House made health reform its top legislative priority after enacting the $814 billion stimulus from the American Recovery and Reinvestment Act of 2009.

When Orszag resigned, the Progressive Policy Institute summed up his time in office: "For an administration numbers-cruncher, he was unusually visible, which was a good thing. With a reputation for impartiality and brilliance, Orszag gave the administration's agenda analytical ballast. There will no doubt be efforts on the right to brush Orszag with the red ink that the administration finds itself swimming in, but that's politics as usual. Inheriting the worst economy since the 1930s, Orszag presided over the Herculean task of preventing a complete meltdown and setting the foundation for a recovery. In many ways, he's a reflection of the administration at its best: a rigorous, pragmatic empiricist."

Citigroup
Orszag held two jobs at Citigroup: Vice Chairman of Corporate and Investment Banking and Chairman of the Financial Strategy and Solutions Group. He joined Citigroup in 2011.  According to New York Magazine, "for an ambitious economist like Peter Orszag, going to work for Citigroup represented a choice. As a young staffer working in the Clinton White House, he saw laid before him two different paths: Stiglitzism and Rubinism. There were both intellectual and career-arc components to these. While both are liberal Democrats, Rubin was the consummate insider, whose philosophy was that the free markets, balanced budgets, and limited regulation would create a rising tide that would lift all boats (or at least make Wall Street not complain too much about Clinton's social programs). Stiglitz, the public intellectual, is as concerned with the boats as with the tide. Orszag certainly had a lot in common with Stiglitz's academic mien, having grown up in an intensely intellectual family in Lexington, Massachusetts, outside Boston. His father was the celebrated Yale math professor Steven Orszag. But Orszag possessed an ambition that would take him beyond the ivory tower. He ultimately chose Rubinism. It makes perfect sense that Orszag would have been drawn toward Rubin. It must have been incredibly seductive seeing this world, watching the Rubin wing of the Democratic Party move so easily from government to Wall Street boardrooms to the table with Charlie Rose."

Lazard
In May 2016, Orszag joined Lazard as Vice Chairman of investment banking and Managing Director. He was later named Global Co-Head of Healthcare and, subsequent to that, Head of North American M&A. Orszag took over as CEO of Financial Advisory in June 2019, overseeing the firm's advisory work for corporations and governments across the globe. Orszag has been charged with "breathing new life into Lazard" as the firm faces increased competition from copycat advisory firms. As CEO, Orszag led Lazard's team of advisors who worked with Argentina's government during the country's $65 billion sovereign debt restructuring in 2020.

Personal life

Orszag's first wife was Cameron Rachel Hamill.New York Times: "Cameron Hamill and Peter Orszag" August 31, 1997 They had two children before divorcing. In 2009, he fathered a child with his former girlfriend, Claire Milonas, daughter of shipping magnate Spiros Milonas. In 2010, Orszag married Bianna Golodryga, then co-host of ABC's GMA Weekend. They have a son and a daughter. Orszag is Jewish.Jewish Daily Forward: "The Exodus" by Nathan Guttman September 30, 2010 In 2014, Orszag won a protracted, contentious child support case brought by Hamill (who had since changed her name to Kennedy).  The judge rejected Kennedy's case against Orszag.

Bibliography
 Orszag, Peter. 1999. Administrative Costs in Individual Accounts in the United Kingdom. Washington, DC: Center on Budget and Policy Priorities
 Orszag, Peter and Joseph E. Stiglitz. "Rethinking Pension Reform: Ten Myths about Social Security Systems." In Robert Holzman and Joseph Stiglitz, eds., New Ideas about Old Age Security. (The World Bank: 2001).
 Orszag, Peter, J. Michael Orszag. "The Benefits of Flexible Funding: Implications for Pension Reform in an Uncertain World." In Annual Bank Conference on Development Economics. (The World Bank: 2001).
 Orszag, Peter, et al. American Economic Policy in the 1990s (MIT Press: 2002)
 Orszag, Peter, et al. Protecting the American Homeland: A Preliminary Analysis (Brookings Institution Press: 2002)
 "Implications of the New Fannie Mae and Freddie Mac Risk-Based Capital Standard" (March).Fannie Mae Papers 1, no. 2 (March 2002) 
 Orszag, Peter, et al. Saving Social Security: A Balanced Approach (Brookings Institution Press: 2004)
 Orszag, Peter and Diamond, Peter, Saving Social Security: The Diamond-Orszag Plan (Brookings Institution: Apr. 2005) 
 Orszag, Peter, et al. Protecting the Homeland 2006/7 (Brookings Institution Press: 2006)
 Orszag, Peter, et al. Aging Gracefully: Ideas to Improve Retirement Security in America'' (Century Foundation Press: 2006)

References

External links

 
 OMB leadership biographies
 Article in the New Yorker, May 4, 2009
 
 
 
 
 Peter Orszag articles and columns on Bloomberg Press

|-

1968 births
Alumni of the London School of Economics
American people of Hungarian-Jewish descent
Jewish American social scientists
McKinsey & Company people
Jewish American bankers
Assistants to the President of the United States
Citigroup people
Clinton administration personnel
Massachusetts Democrats
Directors of the Office of Management and Budget
Directors of the Congressional Budget Office
Living people
Marshall Scholars
Members of the National Academy of Medicine
Obama administration cabinet members
21st-century American politicians
Jewish American government officials
Jewish American members of the Cabinet of the United States
People from Lexington, Massachusetts
People from Washington, D.C.
Phillips Exeter Academy alumni
Princeton University alumni
University of California, Berkeley faculty
Jewish American economists
Economists from Massachusetts
21st-century American economists
Peterson Institute for International Economics
Brookings Institution people
Orszag family